

Championships

World Championship
Men
Gold medal: Yugoslavia
Silver medal: Argentina
Bronze medal: Germany
Final match: Yugoslavia 84, Argentina 77
MVP: Dirk Nowitzki, Germany
All-tournament team: Nowitzki, Pero Cameron (New Zealand), Manu Ginóbili (Argentina), Peja Stojakovic (Yugoslavia), Yao Ming (China)
Women
Gold medal: USA
Silver medal: Russia
Bronze medal: Australia
Final match: USA 79, Russia 74

Professional
Men
2002 NBA Finals:  Los Angeles Lakers over the New Jersey Nets 4-0.  MVP:  Tim Duncan  (More information can be found at 2002-03 NBA season.)
 2002 NBA Playoffs, 2002 NBA draft, 2001-02 NBA season, 2002 NBA All-Star Game
 Philippine Basketball Association 2002 season:
Purefoods TJ Hotdogs over the Alaska Aces 4-3 in the Governor's Cup Finals
Red Bull Thunder over the Talk 'N Text Phone Pals 4-3 in the Commissioner's Finals
Coca-Cola Tigers over the Alaska Aces 3-1 in the All-Filipino Cup Finals
Euroleague: Panathinaikos over Kinder Bologna 89-83 in the final match.
Women
WNBA Finals: Los Angeles Sparks over the New York Liberty 2-0.  MVP:  Lisa Leslie
2002 WNBA season, 2002 WNBA Playoffs, 2002 WNBA draft, 2002 WNBA All-Star Game

College
Men
NCAA Division I:  Maryland 64, Indiana 52
National Invitation Tournament:  University of Memphis
NCAA Division II: Metropolitan State College of Denver 80, Kentucky Wesleyan College 72
NCAA Division III: Otterbein College 102, Elizabethtown College 83
NAIA Division I Oklahoma Science & Arts 96, Oklahoma Baptist University 79
NAIA Division II Evangel (Mo.) 84, Robert Morris (Ill.) 61
Women
NCAA Division I:  University of Connecticut 82, Oklahoma 70
Women's National Invitation Tournament: University of Oregon
NCAA Division II: Cal Poly Pomona 74, Southeastern Oklahoma 62
NCAA Division III Wis.-Stevens Point 67, St. Lawrence 65
NAIA Division I: Oklahoma City 82, Southern Nazarene (Okla.) 73
NAIA Division II Hastings (Neb.) 73, Cornerstone (Mich.) 69

Awards and honors

Professional
Men
NBA Most Valuable Player Award:   Tim Duncan
NBA Rookie of the Year Award:  Pau Gasol
NBA Defensive Player of the Year Award:  Ben Wallace
NBA Coach of the Year Award: Rick Carlisle, Detroit Pistons
Euroscar Award: Dirk Nowitzki, Dallas Mavericks and 
Mr. Europa: Peja Stojaković, Sacramento Kings and  Serbia and Montenegro
Women
WNBA Most Valuable Player Award: Sheryl Swoopes, Houston Comets
WNBA Defensive Player of the Year Award: Sheryl Swoopes, Houston Comets
WNBA Rookie of the Year Award: Tamika Catchings, Indiana Fever
WNBA Most Improved Player Award: Coco Miller, Washington Mystics
Kim Perrot Sportsmanship Award: Jennifer Gillom, Phoenix Mercury
WNBA Coach of the Year Award: Marianne Stanley, Washington Mystics
WNBA All-Star Game MVP: Lisa Leslie, Los Angeles Sparks
WNBA Finals Most Valuable Player Award: Lisa Leslie, Los Angeles Sparks

Collegiate 
 Combined
Legends of Coaching Award: Denny Crum, Louisville
 Men
John R. Wooden Award: Jay Williams, Duke
Naismith College Coach of the Year: Ben Howland, Pittsburgh
Frances Pomeroy Naismith Award: Steve Logan, Cincinnati
Associated Press College Basketball Player of the Year: Jay Williams, Duke
NCAA basketball tournament Most Outstanding Player: Carmelo Anthony, Syracuse
USBWA National Freshman of the Year: T. J. Ford, Texas
Associated Press College Basketball Coach of the Year: Ben Howland, Pittsburgh
Naismith Outstanding Contribution to Basketball: Don Haskins
 Women
Naismith College Player of the Year: Sue Bird, Connecticut
Naismith College Coach of the Year: Geno Auriemma, Connecticut
Wade Trophy: Sue Bird, Connecticut
Frances Pomeroy Naismith Award: Sheila Lambert, Baylor
Associated Press Women's College Basketball Player of the Year: Sue Bird, Connecticut
NCAA basketball tournament Most Outstanding Player: Swin Cash, UConn
Basketball Academic All-America Team: Stacey Dales-Schuman, Oklahoma
Carol Eckman Award: Barbara Stevens, Bentley College
Associated Press College Basketball Coach of the Year: Brenda Oldfield, Minnesota
List of Senior CLASS Award women's basketball winners: Sue Bird, Connecticut
Nancy Lieberman Award: Sue Bird, Connecticut
Naismith Outstanding Contribution to Basketball: Billie Moore

Naismith Memorial Basketball Hall of Fame
Class of 2002:
 Harlem Globetrotters
 Larry Brown
 Earvin "Magic" Johnson
 Robert "Lute" Olson
 Drazen Petrovic
 Sandra Kay Yow

Women's Basketball Hall of Fame
Class of 2002
 Cindy Brogdon
 Hortência Marcari
 Kamie Ethridge
 Margaret Sexton Gleaves
 Sandra Meadows
 Lea Plarski
 Marianne Crawford Stanley
 Tara VanDerveer

Events

Movies
Double Teamed
Juwanna Mann
Like Mike

Deaths
 January 6 — Fred Taylor, Hall of Fame coach of the 1960 National Champion Ohio State Buckeyes (born 1924)
 January 7 — Geoff Crompton, American NBA player (born 1955)
 January 18 — Alex Hannum, Hall of Fame pro basketball coach (born 1923)
 January 26 — Milt Ticco, American NBL player (born 1922)
 February 2 — Ed Jucker, American college coach (Cincinnati) (born 1916)
 February 13 — Bob Gerber, American NBL player (born 1916)
 February 21 — Gene Sullivan, American college coach (Loyola (Illinois)) (born 1931)
 March 11 — Al Bonniwell, American NBL player (Akron Firestone Non-Skids) (born 1911)
 March 18 — Don Betourne, American NBL player and coach (Kankakee Gallagher Trojans) (born 1915)
 May 5 — Jimmy Smith, American college All-American (Steubenville) (born 1934)
 June 3 — Cecil Hankins, NBA player (St. Louis Bombers, Boston Celtics) (born 1922)
 June 22 — Bobby Roberts, American college coach (Clemson).
 July 7 — Bison Dele, NBA player (born 1969)
 July 17 — Ubiratan Pereira Maciel, Hall of Fame Brazilian basketball player (born 1944)
 July 27 — Billy McCann, 82, American college coach (Hampden–Sydney, Washington and Lee, Virginia).
 August 8 — Chick Hearn, television and radio announcer for the Los Angeles Lakers (born 1916)
 September 2 — Abe Lemons, American college coach (Oklahoma City, Texas) (born 1922)
 September 7 — Edward Spotovich, American NBL player (born 1916)
 September 14 — Jim Barnes, Former #1 overall NBA draft pick and 1964 Olympic Gold medalist (born 1941)
 September 23 — Jule Rivlin, American NBL player (Akron Goodyear Wingfoots, Toledo Jeeps) and college coach (Marshall) (born 1917)
 December 17 — Bobby Joe Hill, American college national champion at Texas Western (1966) (born 1943)
 December 17 — Hank Luisetti, college basketball player and inventor of the layup; first player to score 50 points in a game (born 1916)

References

External links